This is a list of diseases of foliage plants belonging to the Araceae.

Plant Species

Bacterial diseases

Fungal diseases

Viral diseases

References
Common Names of Diseases, The American Phytopathological Society

Foliage plant (Araceae)